Muhammad Ali al-Halabi (1937 – 19 September 2016) was a Syrian politician.

Biography
After finishing his training at the National Teacher Training Institute, Muhammed studied Philosophy at the University of Damascus. In 1955 he became a teacher on the Golan and from 1959 to 1964 he was employed as a teacher in Kuwait. From 9 June 1973 to 27 March 1978 he was chairman and spokesman for the National Council. He served as Prime Minister of Syria from March 27, 1978 to January 9, 1980 under the presidency of Hafez al-Assad. al-Halabi was an ambassador in Moscow from 1982 to 1990, during which Hafiz al-Assad and Leonid Brezhnev made an agreement,  to install the Soviet S-75 in al-Dumayr and Shinshar.

Political career

References

External links
 More photos of Muhammad Ali al-Halabi

1937 births
2016 deaths
Prime Ministers of Syria
Speakers of the People's Assembly of Syria
Members of the Regional Command of the Arab Socialist Ba'ath Party – Syria Region
Politicians from Damascus